David Alexander Tweed (13 November 1959 – 28 October 2021) was a Northern Irish politician, Irish rugby union international and alleged serial child sex offender. He served as a Traditional Unionist Voice councillor on Ballymena Borough Council.

Sport
Tweed won four caps for Ireland in the mid-1990s, with his first, against France, in 1995.

Political career
Tweed was first elected as a DUP councillor for the Ballymena South electoral district in 1997. He was re-elected for the DUP in 2001 and 2005.

In 2007 Tweed was among six Ballymena DUP councillors who refused to canvass for the party in the Assembly elections because of the DUP's policy of sharing power with Sinn Féin. Tweed attempted to resign in February 2007, and he along with five other councillors subsequently resigned from the party and redesignated themselves as the Ulster Unionist Coalition Party (UUCP).

In 2009, four of the UUCP group left to join Traditional Unionist Voice (TUV), but Tweed remained with the UUCP along with councillor William Wilkinson, head of research for the unionist pressure group Families Acting for Innocent Relatives. In June 2010 Wilkinson was imprisoned, following his conviction for rape. In November 2010, Tweed joined the Traditional Unionist Voice bloc on the council, and he was re-elected in 2011 to Ballymena Borough Council as a TUV candidate.

Tweed was a member of the Orange Order and belonged to a lodge in Dunloy. He was involved in protests relating to the Parades Commission's restrictions on Orange marches in Dunloy.

Loyalist involvement
Between 1996-1999, Tweed was involved in the Harryville dispute when loyalists picketed a Catholic church in Ballymena.

On 8 June 2006, at a Ballymena Borough Council meeting, Tweed said that he "questioned the upbringing" of a 15-year-old Catholic, Michael McIlveen, who had recently been murdered in Ballymena in a sectarian attack. He also claimed people linked to the victim's family had been involved in intimidation of Protestants after the murder.

Legal issues
On 29 October 1997, shortly after his election to Ballymena Council, Tweed was fined at Coleraine magistrates court for assaulting a man in a pub.

On 22 September 2007, Tweed was stopped while driving a car under the influence of alcohol. On 21 January 2008, North Antrim Magistrates Court banned him from driving for a year and handed down a £250 fine.

Sexual abuse cases
In January 2009, Tweed was charged with ten sex offences against two young girls, spanning an eight-year period; he was acquitted in May 2009.

He was acquitted on 27 November 2012 of one charge of indecent assault on a child.

On 28 November 2012, he was convicted on 13 counts of gross indecency, indecent assault of two young girls and inciting gross indecency, spanning an eight-year period from 1988 onwards. His conviction was quashed on 25 October 2016, due to issues around presentation of evidence of bad character. As he had served almost 4 years in prison he was not retried. in November 2021 Tweed's stepdaughter Amanda Brown spoke on BBC Radio Ulster TalkBack programme, of the alleged sustained sexual abuse she suffered at his hands. She questioned the appeal process and explained the reason she was unable to face a further court case. Brown called on the prominent politicians who eulogised him at the time of his death to reconsider their remarks. Her siblings have also spoken of their alleged experiences of Tweed's sexual abuse,  Victoria and Catherine Alexander Tweed waived their right to anonymity to speak of this abuse. 

After the conviction was announced the Orange Order terminated his membership of the organisation. The Royal Black Institution, of which Tweed was also a member, stated it had begun the process of expelling him from its membership. Pending sentencing he remained a member of Ballymena Borough Council and of the TUV, although the party announced on 15 November 2012 that it had 'suspended' his membership "not because we doubt his innocence, but because this is what the party rules require." The TUV noted that the sex offences related "to a period long before he was a member of this party". The TUV chose one of its unsuccessful 2011 candidates, Timothy Gaston, to replace Tweed as a councillor.

Personal life
Tweed was born on a farm outside Dunloy in Ballymoney, County Antrim in November 1959. He married in 1984, he and his wife had four children; the family lived in Ballymoney. Prior to his 2012 conviction Tweed was estranged from his wife, Margaret, and had been living in Ballymena. Employed as an infrastructure supervisor for Northern Ireland Railways, he previously worked as a bouncer at a Ballymoney bar.

Tweed died in a motorcycle crash on 28 October 2021 in County Antrim, at the age of 61.

Following his death, members of his family, and the victims of his now-quashed conviction due to lack of evidence, have spoken of the effect on them of his alleged sexual and physical abuse.

References

1959 births
2021 deaths
Ballymena R.F.C. players
Democratic Unionist Party councillors
Ireland international rugby union players
Irish rugby union players
Members of Ballymena Borough Council
Northern Ireland politicians convicted of crimes
Overturned convictions in the United Kingdom
People from Ballymoney
People from Northern Ireland convicted of child sexual abuse
People from Northern Ireland convicted of indecent assault
Politicians convicted of sex offences
Rugby union locks
Traditional Unionist Voice politicians
Ulster Rugby players